Sajasan (사자산; 獅子山) may refer to:

Sajasan (Gangwon-do), mountain in South Korea
Sajasan (Jeollanam-do), mountain in South Korea